The following is a list of people whose names were given to craters of the Moon. The list of approved names in the Gazetteer of Planetary Nomenclature maintained by the International Astronomical Union includes the person the crater is named for.

A

 Ernst Karl Abbe
 Charles Greeley Abbot
 Niels Henrik Abel
 Antonio Abetti
 Giorgio Abetti
 Abu Abdullah al-Bakri
 Abū al-Wafā' al-Būzjānī
 Charles Hitchcock Adams
 John Couch Adams
 Walter Sydney Adams
 Agatharchides
 Agrippa
 Pierre d'Ailly
 George Biddell Airy
 Robert Grant Aitken
 Ajima Naonobu
 Harold Alden
 Kurt Alder
 Buzz Aldrin
 Nikolai Alekhin
 Alexander the Great
 Alfonso X of Castile
 Alfraganus
 Dinsmore Alter
 Florentino Ameghino
 Giovanni Battista Amici
 Ammonius Saccas
 Guillaume Amontons
 Roald Amundsen
 Anaxagoras
 Anaximander
 Anaximenes of Miletus
 Karel Anděl
 William Anders
 John August Anderson
 Michael P. Anderson
 Leif Erland Andersson
 Aleksandr Andronov
 Anders Jonas Ångström
 Ansgar
 Eugène Michel Antoniadi
 Dmitry Nikolayevich Anuchin
 Jean Baptiste Bourguignon d'Anville
 Petrus Apianus
 Apollonius of Perga
 Edward Victor Appleton
 François Arago
 Aratus
 Archimedes
 Archytas
 Friedrich Wilhelm Argelander
 Aristarchus of Samos
 Aristillus
 Aristotle
 Franciszek Armiński
 Neil Armstrong
 Christoph Arnold
 Svante Arrhenius
 Lev Artsimovich
 Aryabhata
 Arzachel
 Goryu Asada
 Giuseppe Asclepi
 Joseph Ashbrook
 Francis William Aston
 George Atwood
 Autolycus of Pitane
 Arthur Auwers
 Adrien Auzout
 Oswald Avery
 Avicenna

B

 Walter Baade
 Georgi Babakin
 Charles Babbage
 Harold D. Babcock
 Ernst Emil Alexander Back
 Oskar Backlund
 Roger Bacon
 Benjamin Baillaud
 Jean Sylvain Bailly
 Francis Baily
 Ibn Bajjah
 Aleksei Balandin
 Vasco Núñez de Balboa
 Fernand Baldet
 William Ball
 Johann Jakob Balmer
 Tadeusz Banachiewicz
 Wilder Dwight Bancroft
 Frederick Banting
 Charles Glover Barkla
 Edward Emerson Barnard
 Francesco Barozzi
 Daniel Barringer
 Muhammad ibn Jābir al-Harrānī al-Battānī
 Ibn Battuta
 Johann Bayer
 Antonín Bečvář
 Wilhelm Beer
 Torbern Bergman
 Friedrich Wilhelm Bessel
 Nur Ed-Din Al Betrugi
 Giuseppe Biancani
 Francesco Bianchini - Bianchini crater north of Sinus Iridium
 Giovanni Bianchini - Blanchinus crater - Southern Hemisphere
 Wilhelm von Biela
 Jacques de Billy
 Hiram Bingham III
 Abū Rayhān al-Bīrūnī
 Mary Adela Blagg
 Étienne Bobillier
 Johann Elert Bode
 Niels Bohr
 Priscilla Fairfield Bok
 János Bolyai
 George Phillips Bond - named for G. Bond crater
 Aimé Bonpland
 George Boole
 Émile Borel
 Roger Joseph Boscovich (or Rudjer Bošković)
 Jagdish Chandra Bose
 Ira S. Bowen
 Frederick Sumner Brackett
 Tycho Brahe
 Edward William Brayley
 Sir David Brewster
 David McDowell Brown
 Catherine Wolfe Bruce
 Giordano Bruno
 Henri Buisson
 Johann Tobias Bürg
 Joost Bürgi
 Sherburne Wesley Burnham
 Richard Evelyn Byrd

C

 Cai Lun
 Santiago Ramón y Cajal
 Calippus
 Robert Curry Cameron
 Campanus of Novara
 Annie Jump Cannon
 Francesco Capuano di Manfredonia
 Francesco Carlini
 Paolo Casati
 Miguel A. Catalán
 Saint Catherine of Alexandria
 Augustin Louis Cauchy
 Bonaventura Cavalieri
 Henry Cavendish
 Arthur Cayley
 Anders Celsius
 Jean Chacornac
 James Challis
 Sergei Chaplygin
 Kalpana Chawla
 Pafnuty Chebyshev
 Temple Chevallier
 Franceso degli Stabili Cichus
 Laurel Clark
 Rudolf Clausius
 Christopher Clavius
 Cleostratus
 Agnes Mary Clerke
 William Coblentz
 Michael Collins (astronaut)
 Edward Uhler Condon
 Marquis de Condorcet
 Conon of Samos
 Nicolaus Copernicus
 Gerty Theresa Cori
 Cristóbal Acosta
 Andrew Crommelin
 Peter Crüger
 Ctesibius
 Pierre Curie

D

 Louis Daguerre
 Reginald A. Daly
 John Frederick Daniell
 Heinrich Louis d'Arrest
 Maurice Darney
 Charles Darwin
 Gabriel Auguste Daubrée
 Humphry Davy
 William Rutter Dawes
 Jean Baptiste Joseph Delambre
 Charles-Eugène Delaunay
 Joseph-Nicolas Delisle
 William Frederick Denning
 Rene Descartes
 Jules Alfred Pierrot Deseilligny
 Henri-Alexandre Deslandres
 Denis Diderot
 Saint Dionysius
 Diophantus
 Peter Gustav Lejeune Dirichlet
 Audouin Dollfus
 John Dollond
 Giovanni Battista Donati
 Johann Gabriel Doppelmayr
 Henry Draper
 John Louis Emil Dreyer
 Hugh Latimer Dryden
 Dmitrij I. Dubyago
 Alexander D. Dubyago
 Richard Dunthorne
 Wladyslaw Dziewulski

E

 Amelia Earhart (provisional)
 Thomas Edison
 Hans Egede
 Albert Einstein
 Thomas Gwyn Elger
 Mervyn A. Ellison
 Johann Franz Encke
 Epigenes
 Eratosthenes
 Joseph Erlanger
 Luis Enrique Erro
 Ernest Esclangon
 T. H. E. C. Espin
 Euclid
 Euctemon
 Eudoxus of Cnidus
 Leonhard Euler
 Abraham ibn Ezra

F

 Daniel Gabriel Fahrenheit
 Michael Faraday
 Ahmad ibn Muhammad ibn Kathīr al-Farghānī
 Hervé Faye
 Enrico Fermi
 Jean Fernel
 Abbas Ibn Firnas
 Lucius Taruntius Firmanus
 Camille Flammarion
 John Flamsteed
 Alexander Fleming
 Williamina Paton Stevens Fleming
 Philip Fox
 Girolamo Fracastoro
 Fra Mauro
 James Franck

G

 Vasco da Gama
 Yuri Gagarin
 Claudius Galen
 Galileo Galilei
 Johann Gottfried Galle
 Évariste Galois
 Luigi Galvani
 Irvine Clifton Gardner
 Annibale de Gasparis
 Pierre Gassendi
 Casimir Marie Gaudibert
 Luca Gaurico
 Carl Friedrich Gauss
 Joseph Louis Gay-Lussac
 Hans Geiger
 Gersonides
 Josiah Willard Gibbs
 Grove Karl Gilbert
 William Gilbert
 Friedrich Karl Ginzel
 Flavio Gioja
 Rudolf Goclenius, Jr.
 Louis Godin
 Camillo Golgi
 Benjamin A. Gould
 Ivan Grave
 George Green
 James Gregory
 Francesco Maria Grimaldi
 William Robert Grove
 Otto von Guericke
 John Guest
 Charles Édouard Guillaume
 Colin Stanley Gum
 Arnold Henry Guyot
 Hugo Gyldén

H

 Wilhelm Karl von Haidinger
 Paul Hainzel
 Tadeáš Hájek
 J.B.S. Haldane
 George Ellery Hale
 Asaph Hall
 Edmond Halley
 Peter Andreas Hansen
 Spiru Haret
 Frederick James Hargreaves
 Harkhebi
 Ernst Hartwig
 Bernard Ray Hawke
 Ibn al-Haytham
 Hecataeus
 Oliver Heaviside
 Gottfried Heinsius
 Hermann von Helmholtz
 Joseph Henry
 Paul Henry and Prosper Henry
 Pierre Hérigone
 Charles Hermite
 Hero of Alexandria, or Hero
 Caroline Herschel - named for C. Herschel crater
 John Herschel - named for J. Herschel crater
 William Herschel - named for Herschel crater
 Heinrich Hertz
 Hesiod
 Jaroslav Heyrovský
 David Hilbert
 George William Hill
 John Russell Hind
 Hippalus
 Hipparchus
 Edward Singleton Holden
 Robert Hooke
 Peder Horrebow
 Jeremiah Horrocks
 Martin van den Hove
 Edwin Hubble
 Sir William Huggins
 Rick Husband
 Thomas Henry Huxley
 Gaius Julius Hyginus
 Hypatia

I

Christian Ludwig Ideler
Naum Ilyich Idelson
Nikolai Yakovlevich Il'in — Il'in (crater)
Albert Graham Ingalls
Giovanni Inghirami
Robert Thorburn Ayton Innes
Abram Fedorovich Ioffe
Aleksei Mihailovich Isaev
Imre Izsak

J
 Jabir ibn Aflah (Geber)
 Michael Jackson
 Zacharias Jansen
 Karl Jansky
 Pierre Jules César Janssen
 Louise Freeland Jenkins

K

 Frederick Kaiser
 Theodore von Kármán
 Mstislav Keldysh
 Johannes Kepler
 Omar Khayyám
 Muhammad ibn Mūsā al-Khwārizmī
 Johann Kies
 Arthur Scott King
 Edward Skinner King
 Gottfried Kirch
 Gustav Kirchhoff
 Harold Knox-Shaw
 Rudolf König
 Sofia Kovalevskaya
 M.A. Koval'sky
 Adam Johann Krusenstern
 Gerard Peter Kuiper
 August Kundt
 George K. Kunowsky

L

 Nicolas Louis de Lacaille
 Heinrich Eduard von Lade
 Joseph Jérôme Le François de Lalande
 Jean-Baptiste Lamarck
 Johann Heinrich Lambert
 Johann von Lamont
 Jonathan Homer Lane
 Michel van Langren
 William Lassell
 Ernest Lawrence
 Robert Henry Lawrence, Jr.
 Henrietta Swan Leavitt
 John Lee (astronomer)
 Pierre Charles Lemonnier
 Nicole-Reine Lepaute
 Jean Antoine Letronne
 Tullio Levi-Civita
 Anders Johan Lexell
 Aloysius Lilius
 Eric Mervyn Lindsay
 Hans Lippershey
 Joseph Johann Littrow
 Joseph Norman Lockyer
 Maurice (Moritz) Loewy
 Oswald Lohse
 Mikhail Lomonosov
 Augustus Edward Hough Love
 Percival Lowell
 Charles Lyell

M

 Sir Thomas Maclear
 William Duncan MacMillan
 Johann Heinrich Mädler
 Ferdinand Magellan
 Giovanni Antonio Magini
 Charles Malapert
 Al-Ma'mun
 Marcus Manilius
 Giovanni Domenico Maraldi
 Giacomo Filippo (Jacques Philippe) Maraldi
 Al-Marrakushi
 Albert Marth
 Julius Firmicus Maternus
 Annie Russell Maunder
 Walter Maunder
 Pierre Louis Maupertuis
 Francesco Maurolico
 Antonia Maury
 James Clerk Maxwell
 Tobias Mayer - T. Mayer crater
 Alexander George McAdie
 Sharon Christa McAuliffe
 William C. McCool
 William Frederick Meggers
 Lise Meitner
 Gregor Mendel
 Dmitri Mendeleev
 Menelaus of Alexandria
 Donald Howard Menzel
 Gerardus Mercator
 Marin Mersenne
 Milutin Milanković
 Jacob Milich
 William Allen Miller
 Marcel Minnaert
 Maria Mitchell
 Sisir Kumar Mitra
 August Ferdinand Möbius
 Nikolay Moiseyev
 Gaspard Monge
 Abrahão de Moraes
 Nikolai Morozov
 Henry Moseley
 Johan Sigismund von Mösting
 Karl Müller
 Sir Roderick Murchison

N

 Fridtjof Nansen
 John Napier
 Michael Neander
 Necho II - Necho crater
 Simon Newcomb
 Isaac Newton
 Friedrich Bernhard Gottfried Nicolai
 Jean Nicholas Nicollet
 Alfred Nobel
 Emmy Noether
 Robert Norman
 Pedro Nuñez Salaciense
 Joseph Nunn
 František Nušl

O

 Hermann Oberth
 Marcus O'Day
 Heinrich Olbers
 Friedrich Wilhelm Opelt
 Otto Moritz Opelt
 J. Robert Oppenheimer
 Theodor von Oppolzer
 Oronce Fine
 Wilhelm Ostwald

P

 Johann Palisa
 Peter Simon Pallas
 Paracelsus
 John Stefanos Paraskevopoulos
 Johann Jacob Friedrich Wilhelm Parrot
 William Edward Parry
 John Whiteside Parsons
 Louis Pasteur
 Wolfgang Pauli
 Robert Peary
 Francis G. Pease
 Bertrand Meigh Peek
 Joseph Barclay Pentland
 Yevgeny Perepyolkin
 Joseph von Petzval
 Georg von Peuerbach (Purbach)
 Philip III of Macedon
 John Phillips
 Philolaus of Croton
 Johannes Phocylides Holwarda (Jan Fokker)
 Giuseppe Piazzi
 Jean-Felix Picard
 Alessandro Piccolomini
 Marc-Auguste Pictet
 Edward Charles Pickering
 William Henry Pickering
 Pietro Pitati
 Bartholomaeus Pitiscus
 Max Planck
 John Playfair
 Pliny the Elder (Gaius Secundus)
 Plutarch
 Siméon Denis Poisson
 Marco Polo
 Ivan Ivanovich Polzunov
 Jean-Louis Pons
 Johannes (Iovianus) Pontanus, or Giovanni Pontani
 Alexander Stepanovich Popov
 Cyril Popov
 Posidonius
 Proclus Lycius
 Mary Proctor
 Protagoras
 Ptolemy
 Pierre Puiseux
 Jan Evangelist

R

 Ilan Ramon
 Albert William Recht
 Erasmus Reinhold
 Vincentio Reinieri
 Judith Arlene Resnik
 Matteo Ricci
 Giovanni Battista Riccioli
 Klaus Riedel
 George Willis Ritchey
 Carl Ritter
 George August Dietrich Ritter
 Ole Rømer
 James C. Ross
 Frank E. Ross
 Lord Rosse
 Ernest Rutherford
 Graham Ryder

S

 Paul Sabatier
 Shah Rukh Khan
 Vojtěch Šafařík
 Eugen Sänger
 Daniel Santbech
 Alberto Santos Dumont (Santos-Dumont (crater))
 Vikram Sarabhai
 Gellio Sasceride
 Horace-Bénédict de Saussure
 Samuel Arthur Saunder
 Carl Wilhelm Scheele
 Giovanni Schiaparelli
 Johann Friedrich Julius Schmidt
 Bernhard Schmidt
 Otto Yulyevich Schmidt
 Georg Schomberger
 Johann Hieronymus Schröter
 Theodor von Schubert
 Anton Maria Schyrleus of Rheita
 Angelo Secchi
 Hugo Hans Ritter von Seeliger
 Ján Andrej Segner
 Hugh Sempill
 Seneca the Younger
 Gerolamo Sersale
 Carl Keenan Seyfert
 Abraham Sharp
 Anne Sheepshanks
 Shi Shen
 Wacław Sierpiński
 Johann Esaias Silberschlag
 Simon Sinas
 Marie Sklodowska Curie
 Earl Slipher
 Vesto Slipher
 Marian Smoluchowski
 Willebrord Snellius
 Frederick Soddy
 Mary Fairfax Somerville
 Samuel Thomas Sömmering
 Sosigenes of Alexandria
 Sir James South
 Lazzaro Spallanzani
 Gustav Spörer
 Johannes Stadius
 Nicholas Steno
 Andreas Stöberl
 Johannes Stöffler
 George Johnstone Stoney
 Thomas Street
 Strabo
 Lewis A. Swift
 Leó Szilárd

T

 Pietro Tacchini
 Tacitus
 André Tacquet
 Taruntius
 Brook Taylor
 Léon Teisserenc de Bort
 Ernst Wilhelm Leberecht Tempel
 Nikola Tesla
 Valentina Tereshkova
 Thales
 Theaetetus
 Theon of Alexandria
 Theon of Smyrna
 Theophrastus
 Timaeus
 Timocharis
 Félix Tisserand
 Konstantin Eduardovich Tsiolkovskiy
 Samuel Tolansky
 Alexey Tolstoy
 Craig R. Tooley
 Franz de Paula Triesnecker
 Étienne Léopold Trouvelot
 Herbert Hall Turner

U
 Friedrich August Ukert
 Ulugh Beg

V

 Jules Verne
 Urbain Le Verrier
 Frank W. Very
 Vesalius
 Vladimir Petrovich Vetchinkin
 Mikhail Anatolevich Vilev
 Leonardo da Vinci
 Rudolf Virchow
 Artturi Ilmari Virtanen
 Marcus P. Vitruvius
 Vincenzo Viviani
 Adriaan Vlacq
 Hermann Carl Vogel
 Vladislav Volkov
 Alessandro Volta
 Vito Volterra
 Leonid Alexandrovich Voskresenskiy

W

 Joseph Albert Walker
 Alfred Russel Wallace
 Otto Wallach
 Bernhard Walther
 Bernard Wapowski
 Pehr Vilhelm Wargentin
 Michael Wargo
 Worcester Reed Warner
 Alan Tower Waterman
 James Watt
 Chester Burleigh Watts
 Thomas William Webb
 Alfred Wegener
 Edmund Weiss
 H. G. Wells
 William Whewell
 Fred Lawrence Whipple
 Moritz Ludwig George Wichmann
 Uco van Wijk
 Rupert Wildt
 Hugh Percy Wilkins
 Arthur Stanley Williams
 John Winthrop
 Erazmus Ciolek Witelo
 Friedrich Wöhler
 Max Wolf
 Francis Wollaston
 Johann Philipp von Wurzelbauer

X
Xenophanes
Xenophon

Y
 Charles T. Yerkes
 Ibn Yunus

Z
 Franz Xaver von Zach
 Abraham Zacuto (or Zagut)
 Herman Zanstra
 Alexander Dmitrievich Zasyadko
 Zeno of Citium
 Zhang Heng
 Johann Karl Friedrich Zöllner

See also 
 Lunar craters named for space explorers
 Stars named after people
 List of minor planets named after people
 List of craters on Mars named after people

Notes

References
 

 

Moon
Moon craters
Moon-related lists